The 1952 Columbia Lions football team was an American football team that represented Columbia University as an independent during the 1952 college football season. 

In their 23rd season under head coach Lou Little, the Lions compiled a 2–6–1 record, and were outscored 184 to 117. Robert McCullough was the team captain.  

Columbia played its home games at Baker Field in Upper Manhattan, in New York City.

Schedule

References

Columbia
Columbia Lions football seasons
Columbia Lions football